Direct carrier billing (DCB) is an online mobile payment method which allows users to make purchases by charging payments to their mobile phone carrier bill. The global direct carrier billing market has a current valuation US$ 54 billion (2022). A new study from Juniper Research has found that the value of end-user spend on digital goods via carrier billing will exceed $74 billion by 2026.

Direct Carrier Billing is useful in mobile payments and interactive services for companies across media, charity, gaming, ticketing, mobility, and other digital services. It is especially effective in developing countries and undeveloped areas where credit card usage is not widespread. There are more than 1 billion adults that still remain unbanked or underbanked.

Service providers
 Bango plc
 Boku, Inc.
 Fortumo
 Google Pay (mobile app)

References

Payment systems
Mobile payments